Meg Connery  (1881–1956), was an Irish suffragist organiser and activist.

Life

Margaret Knight was born to parents John and Bridget Knight (née Kelly) in Westport, County Mayo. She was the third of nine children. One sister, Bridget was also involved in the suffragette movement in America. Her uncle, a Franciscan Friar encouraged her education. Her husband was John Patrick 'Con' Connery and they married in Clonmel in July 1909. Little is known about her before her involvement with the Irish Women's Franchise League. 'Meg' Connery worked with Hanna Sheehy-Skeffington and was as becoming vice-chairwoman of the Irish Women's Franchise League. She was known for her activism, breaking windows and throwing rocks as well as demonstrating, working on the Irish Citizen and going to jail for the cause. She is particularly remembered for the photo taken of her distributing copies of the Irish Citizen to Bonar Law and Sir Edward Carson.

Imprisonments and demonstrations
Connery had no illusions that women would vote in any way differently than men, or that they would use their vote more effectively. She was against the double standards that occurred between women and men. She wrote about it for The Irish Citizen more than once. In Ireland, as elsewhere, public morals must continue in an unhealthy state while we tolerate the shameful double moral standard Despite her regular arrests for destruction of property Connery was entirely against the use of violence to gain the vote. She was jailed for a week in November 1911 after one demonstration and again in November 1912 when she was with the group who broke windows at the Custom House. In 1912 she heckled Winston Churchill. In 1914 Connery arranged for the first speeches on suffrage in Longford, Leitrim, and Roscommon.  In January 1913 she again broke the windows of Dublin Castle and was arrested, this time getting one month's imprisonment. During this time, while in Tullamore, the women went on hunger strike as part of their demand to be treated as political prisoners. One of the other prisoners, Hoskins suffered heart failure and was released. The other women won their position.

1914–1918
World War I saw the introduction of the contagious diseases act which Connery protested as she felt the purpose was to make sex safe for men, especially the soldiers and sailors. In 1915 the British government closed the North Sea for the number of days around the international women's peace conference in The Hague and Irish women were unable to attend. Connery chaired the Irish protest meeting about this in Dublin. Although the Representation of the People Act, 1918 gave a vote to women Connery was critical of the limited access given and continued to demand full equality.

Other concerns
Connery was a member of the Irish Linen Worker's Union. She worked for improvements in working conditions. She also worked for the Irish White Cross and in 1922 she was part of a delegation to review the destruction in Tipperary and Cork by the wars in Ireland. Connery died of heart failure in December 1958.

Further reading

References and sources

 
 
 
 
 
 
 
 
 
 
 
 

1881 births
1956 deaths
Irish suffragists
Hunger Strike Medal recipients